Velagoundampatti is a place in Tamil Nadu, India. It is located on the state highway connecting the district headquarters, Namakkal with the other major town of this area, Thiruchengode. It is located along the State Highways SH-94 stretch, connecting Namakkal with Erode, Tirupur, Coimbatore. Velagoundampatti have two panjayath Aniyar and Marukalampatti.

The temple of Nallayee Amman is located on the state highway, near velgoundampatti police station. In 2011 the old temple is renovated / reconstructed and the kumbabishekam is performed.

Namakkal is known for education, dairy farm, poultry farm, transport and this town too has a pride of having Kongu nadu matric higher secondary school. In both studies and extra curricular activities this school reached in high end. It holds many state ranks in education and National medalist in athletics.

Buses passing through velagoundampatti

private buses
 Erode   -   Namakkal(HARIKRISHNA)

Post office 
637212 is the pin code number of Velagoundampatti S.O post office in Namakkal district, Tamil Nadu, India as codified by Indiapost.

Railway station
The nearest railway station to Velagoundampatti is Velagoundampatti Junction railway station & Namakkal railway station. which is 16 km distance from here.
Nearest Railway junctions are Erode railway station stands nearby of 47 km distance and the next Salem Junction railway station of 63 km from here

Airport
The nearest International Airport is Tiruchirappalli International Airport which is on 110 km Distance and second Coimbatore International Airport with 135 km distance. And The nearest Domestic airport is Salem Airport 70 km from here

River
The nearest river for Velagoundampatti is paramathi velur kaveri river which is 22 km distance from here.

References

Villages in Namakkal district